This list of deepest mines includes operational and non-operational mines that are at least , which is the depth of Veryovkina Cave, the deepest known natural cave in the world. The depth measurements in this list represent the difference in elevation from the entrance of the mine to the deepest excavated point.

See also
List of deepest caves
List of longest tunnels
List of largest mining companies by revenue
List of mines
List of mines in South Africa
List of mining companies
Extreme points of Earth 
Kola Superdeep Borehole

References

External links
Mining Technology website

Lists of mines
Gold mines
Mines